Buckinghamshire Healthcare NHS Trust is an NHS trust which runs Wycombe Hospital, Stoke Mandeville Hospital, Amersham Hospital, Buckingham Community Hospital and Thame Community Hospital, in Buckinghamshire, England.

History 
The trust was established as the Buckinghamshire Hospitals NHS Trust on 1 October 2002, and became operational on 1 April 2003. The trust changed to its current name on 1 November 2010.

There is a plan for reform of NHS services in  Berkshire and Buckinghamshire which envisages some centralisation of services at Stoke Mandeville.  The debate about future hospital provision in the area hinges on the future of neighbouring Heatherwood and Wexham Park Hospitals NHS Foundation Trust which, it is proposed, is to be taken over by Frimley Park Hospital NHS Foundation Trust.

Performance
In October 2013 as a result of the Keogh Review the Trust was put into the highest risk category by the Care Quality Commission. It was put into a buddying arrangement with Salford Royal NHS Foundation Trust.

In February 2014 the Trust announced it would invest £5 million to create 150 new nursing jobs to cut down on agency staff.  “Before Christmas, we recruited 70 nurses and a further 97 nurses will be starting employment with the trust by April.”  The trust spent £19.3 million on agency staff in 2014/5.

A Care Quality Commission inspection in March 2014 found the trust had made ‘significant progress’ with ‘real differences made in a relatively short time to improve quality and the patient experience’. Staff were said to be ‘caring and compassionate and treated patients with dignity and respect’.  As a result, the trust was taken out of special measures in June 2014.

In February 2016 it was expecting a deficit of £5.5 million for the year 2015/6.

See also
 List of NHS trusts

References

External links 
 
 Buckinghamshire Healthcare NHS Trust on the NHS website
 Inspection reports from the Care Quality Commission

NHS hospital trusts
Health in Buckinghamshire